Camăr is a commune located in Sălaj County, Crișana, Romania. It is composed of two villages, Camăr and Pădureni (Erdőaljarakottyás).

Population 
At the 2002 census, 91.7% of inhabitants were Hungarians, 6.4% Romanians and 1.9% Roma. 68.4% were Reformed, 12.6% Baptist, 5.1% each Greek-Catholic and Christian Evangelical, 4.5% Seventh-day Adventist, 1.9% Pentecostal, 1.3% Romanian Orthodox and 0.8% Roman Catholic.

Sights 
 Wooden Church, Camăr, built in the 18th century, historic monument

References

Communes in Sălaj County
Localities in Crișana